The 1998 UK & Ireland Greyhound Racing Year was the 72nd year of greyhound racing in the United Kingdom and Ireland.

Roll of honour

Summary
The National Greyhound Racing Club (NGRC) released the annual returns, with totalisator turnover at £78,981,066 and attendances recorded at 3,606,704. 	

Irish Greyhound Derby champion Toms The Best trained by Nick Savva was voted Greyhound of the Year after finishing runner-up in the Scottish Greyhound Derby at Shawfield Stadium and winning the 1998 English Greyhound Derby.

Linda Mullins won Greyhound Trainer of the Year for the third successive year.

The industry lost Wembley when it was announced that greyhound racing would no longer take place there. The last race was held on Friday 18 December. A twist of fate resulted in a no race on that final night after a hare failure, just like 71 years previous when on the opening night in 1927 the same happened.

Tracks
Independent track Long Eaton in the hands of the receivers Grant Thompson suffered a catastrophic grandstand fire on Sunday 27 December. The receivers had hoped to sell it for £1.5 million to developers but the Erewash council had voted unanimously (44-0) that the track would remain a sporting venue. However that plan was scuppered after the fire which local police treated as suspicious. With no grandstand anyone interested in bringing back racing had pulled out of negotiations. Leading owner, Pat Chambers, had been involved in a scheme to buy the track in January.

News
Wembley Racing Manager John Rowley left the sport whilst Peter Miller moved to Hove. Wembley trainers Ken Tester and Terry Atkins relocated to Catford before switching to Crayford and Oxford respectively, Patsy Cusack joined Crayford and Hazel Dickson joined Wimbledon, John Haynes kept a small kennel to open race, while Wally Ginzel and Pam Heasman would both soon retire.

The Sporting Life closed in May after a merger with the Racing Post; it was the end of an era for the newspaper that had served greyhound racing for decades and its editor Bob Betts. Subsequently the Racing Post sponsored a new festival of racing at Walthamstow.

Seven-time champion trainer John McGee Sr. returned to England after spending four years in Ireland. He leased the Halls Green Farm kennels in Roydon, Essex, where former Walthamstow stars were reared, after selling his Woodlands Kennels in County Kildare. His relationship with the NGRC remained fractious and they announced that they would not be licence him until he met the £30,000 legal bill accumulated from the failed high court ban back in 1994. After agreeing a payment he was given an attachment at Rye House. Meanwhile at Peterborough Racing Manager Mike Middle retired and was replaced by Con Baker.

Sheffield won the Supertrack (a competition between tracks); they beat the competition which included hosts Walthamstow by scoring 81 points; Walthamstow finished 2nd with 69 points with Henlow in third with 39.

Competitions
The last Grand National at Hall Green was won by a greyhound called El Tenor trained by Linda Mullins and owned by Italian film producer Mario Lanfranchi. The brindle dog had won the Essex Vase in 1996 before being disqualified and being switched to hurdles and then won 9 from 13 before the Grand National. During the final El Tenor came from off the pace to catch and beat Quote That and Mullins saw a gap in the open race circuit over stayers hurdles. No other greyhound could compete with him over staying hurdles events and he won many open races throughout the year and passed Poor Sue's record of 69 open victories when picking up another victory at Nottingham in December.

In the Pall Mall Stakes at Oxford Stadium Droopys Eric took a length off Carmels Prince's eight year old track record beating Blue Murlen in the process. Later following a major car accident Droopys Eric was injured with a kennelmate dying and passenger Olive Tasker seriously injured. Eric was withdrawn from the semi finals. On 17 March, Ernie Gaskin Sr. won his third trainer's championship when winning the event at Sittingbourne. The event was the closest in history because Gaskin and Brian Clemenson tied on points, meaning that on count back the number of winners would determine the champion. However they also had an equal number of winners, which resulted in the decision that second placings would count.

During the Golden Jacket final Bubbly Princess won but was then disqualified by the stewards, the connections were waiting at the podium when the announcement took place. Linda Jones and the Bubbly Club lost the £7,500 first prize but Mario Lanfranchi the owner of El Onda gave the trophy away after not being happy at winning by default.

Principal UK races

	

dh=dead heat

Totalisator returns

The totalisator returns declared to the National Greyhound Racing Club for the year 1998 are listed below.

References 

Greyhound racing in the United Kingdom
Greyhound racing in the Republic of Ireland
UK and Ireland Greyhound Racing Year
UK and Ireland Greyhound Racing Year
UK and Ireland Greyhound Racing Year
UK and Ireland Greyhound Racing Year